Papyrus 124 (in the Gregory-Aland numbering), designated by 𝔓124, is a copy of the New Testament in Greek. It is a papyrus manuscript of the Second Epistle to the Corinthians.

Description 
To the present day survived only pieces from one leaf. The surviving texts of 2 Corinthians are verses 11:1-4; 6–9, they are in a fragmentary condition. The manuscript palaeographically had been assigned to the 6th century (INTF). Written in one column per page, 14 lines per page.

The Greek text of this codex probably is a representative of the Alexandrian text-type. It was published by J. David Thomas in 2008.

Location 
The manuscript currently is housed at the Papyrology Rooms of the Sackler Library at Oxford with the shelf number P. Oxy. 4845.

See also 

 List of New Testament papyri
 Oxyrhynchus Papyri
 Biblical manuscript

References

Further reading 

 N. Gonis, D. Colomo, The Oxyrhynchus Papyri LXXII (London: 2008), pp. 3–6.

External links

Images 
 P. Oxy. LXXII 4845 from Papyrology at Oxford's "POxy: Oxyrhynchus Online".

Official registration 
 "Continuation of the Manuscript List" Institute for New Testament Textual Research, University of Münster. Retrieved April 9, 2008

New Testament papyri
6th-century biblical manuscripts
Second Epistle to the Corinthians papyri